Gaetano John Matarazzo III (born September 8, 2002) is an American actor. He began his career on the Broadway stage as Benjamin in Priscilla, Queen of the Desert (2011–12) and as Gavroche in Les Misérables (2014–15). Matarazzo gained recognition for playing Dustin Henderson in the Netflix science-fiction-horror drama series Stranger Things (2016–present). He also hosted the Netflix show Prank Encounters (2019–2021).

Early life 
Gaetano John Matarazzo III was born on 8 September 2002, in New London, Connecticut, to Gaetano Jr. and Heather Matarazzo (no relation to the actress of the same name), but raised in Little Egg Harbor Township, New Jersey, and is of Italian descent. He was born with cleidocranial dysplasia (CCD). He has an older sister and a younger brother.

Career 
He pursued vocal training at Starlight Performing Arts Center in New Jersey. In 2011, he competed and won third place with his vocal solo titled “Ben” at the Starpower Talent Competition Nationals in Uncasville, Connecticut. His first professional credit was in the Broadway musical Priscilla, Queen of the Desert, for which he was cast as a replacement in 2011. Following the production, he took part in a special "Cast of 2032" professional youth performance of Godspell at Circle in the Square Theatre in 2012. In 2013, he joined the Les Misérables 25th Anniversary Tour in the United States in the role of Gavroche; the following year, he played the same role in the Tony-nominated 2014 Broadway revival of the musical.

Matarazzo made his screen acting debut in a 2015 episode of The Blacklist. After he was cast as Dustin Henderson in Stranger Things, the character's background was modified to have CCD as well. The show's first season premiered in July 2016 to critical acclaim. Over the next several years, Matarazzo also appeared in music videos and various reality and competition shows. On May 11, 2018, it was announced that he was cast in the animated film, Hump.  

He began hosting the Netflix hidden camera series Prank Encounters in 2019; he also served as an executive producer. That year, he also appeared in the Hollywood Bowl production of Into the Woods. He provided the voice of Buba in The Angry Birds Movie 2. 

In May 2022, it was announced that Matarazzo would return to Broadway, joining the final cast of the musical Dear Evan Hansen as Jared Kleinman. He starred in the Paramount+ film Honor Society with Angourie Rice, which was released on July 29, 2022.  He voiced as the dragon in Cartoon Saloon's film adaptation of Ruth Stiles Gannett's
My Father's Dragon novel series. It was announced in December 2022 that Matarazzo would be returning to Broadway as Toby in Thomas Kail's revival of Sondheim and Wheeler's Sweeney Todd, alongside Josh Groban and Annaleigh Ashford.

Philanthropy
He uses his platform to raise awareness of CCD and fundraise for CCD Smiles, an organization that helps cover costs of oral surgeries for people with CCD. 

In February 2020, he was as part of Andrew Barth Feldman & Adrian Dickson’s Star Wars musical parody fundraiser SW: A New(sical) Hope to help raise funding for NEXT for AUTISM. Matarazzo joined the cast of Elf for a virtual table reading on December 13, 2020 in support of the Democratic Party of Georgia's campaign in the 2021 Georgia runoff elections.

On April 6, 2021, Matarazzo participated in an hour-long charity Among Us stream on The Tonight Show'''s Twitch account with Jimmy Fallon, Questlove, Tariq Trotter, Captain Kirk Douglas, Sykkuno, Valkyrae, Corpse Husband, and his Stranger Things co-star Noah Schnapp, with proceeds going towards Feeding America. In December 2021, he played Dungeons and Dragons with Jack Black and other stars in the Lost Odyssey: Promised Gold livestream event that benefited Extra Life and the Children’s Miracle Network Hospitals.

During the first week of November 2022, he performed in the musical Parade to ensure that the performing arts can be enjoyed at an  affordable rate for fans at the New York City Center.

Filmography
Film

Television

Music videos

Theater

Awards and nominations

References

External links
 
 
 Gaten Matarazzo on Playbill''

2002 births
21st-century American male actors
American people of Italian descent
American male film actors
American male stage actors
American male television actors
American male voice actors
American male child actors
Living people
Male actors from Connecticut
Male actors from New Jersey
People from Little Egg Harbor Township, New Jersey
Shorty Award winners